Jasem Sadeghi (born March 30, 1986)  is an Iranian football player, who currently plays for  Esteghlal Ahvaz of the IPL

Club career

Sadeghi joined Esteghlal Ahvaz in 2008 after spending the previous season at Shahin Ahvaz F.C.

Club career statistics
Last Update  3 June 2010 

 Assist Goals

References

1986 births
Iranian footballers
Esteghlal Ahvaz players
Shahin Ahvaz players
Foolad FC players
Living people
Association football midfielders
People from Sanandaj